On 12 November 2001, a chartered Fishtail Air Eurocopter AS350 helicopter crashed on a flight from Gamgadhi Army Base to Surkhet in Western Nepal. The accident killed all 6 passengers and crew on board, including Princess Prekshya Shah of Nepal.

Aircraft 
The helicopter involved with the accident was a Eurocopter AS350 Écureuil, which Princcess Prekshya chartered from Nepalgunj.

Crew and victims 
On board the helicopter was Princess Prekshya Shah of Nepal, the younger sister of Queen Aishwarya of Nepal and Queen Komal of Nepal as well as her doctor and security personnel among other acquaintances of the Princess.

Incident 
The helicopter took off at 11:25 NPT on 12 November 2001 from Gamgadhi Army Base. Shortly afterwards, the helicopter plunged into Rara Lake. Two passengers were flung out of the aircraft mid air. According to the Nepali Times, the Princess asked the pilot to "circle over Rara so she could get a better view of the lake when the craft dropped down into the lake while turning".

Investigation
Personnel from a nearby army base took 45 minutes to reach the crash site. Rescue helicopters were deployed and the Princess's body was recovered from the water. At first, authorities assumed that there was only one survivor, however, two passengers could be saved and were flown into hospitals in the Nepalgunj.

Aftermath
In 2009, then Prime Minister of Nepal Pushpa Kamal Dahal alleged that the helicopter crash was directly linked to the Nepalese royal massacre. However, this could not be proven.

References 

Aviation accidents and incidents in 2001
Aviation accidents and incidents in Nepal
2001 in Nepal
Accidents and incidents involving the Eurocopter AS350
2001 disasters in Nepal